Adrian Bumbescu (born 23 February 1960 in Craiova) is a retired Romanian footballer who played as a central defender.

A defender with a tough attitude, he played mostly with Steaua București, helping it win the 1986 European Cup and subsequent European Supercup.

He is one of the most famous and successful players who has ever played in the Romanian First League. He is 2nd in an all time ranking, tied with Giedrius Arlauskis, Ciprian Deac, Mircea Lucescu, Dumitru Stângaciu and Tudorel Stoica, all with 7 championships won. Marius Lăcătuș won it 10 times and is ranked 1st.

Club career
During his career as a player, Bumbescu won the Liga I with three clubs, in an unparalleled feat. His first appearances came during 1978–79 with hometown's FC Universitatea Craiova and, after winning the league in his second season, he signed with FC Dinamo București and conquered another championship in 1982.

After two years at FC Olt Scornicești, Bumbescu moved to national powerhouse FC Steaua București, where he won a further five leagues – being instrumental in four of those – and three domestic cups. He also played complete matches in two of the team's biggest achievements, the 1985–86 European Cup and the subsequent edition of the UEFA Super Cup, which was held the following year.

After 1991–92, Steaua refused to renew Bumbescu's contract. Aged 32, he joined Liga II side Steaua Mizil, where he played three more seasons before eventually retiring from professional football, having appeared in 316 first division games and scored four goals; he later rejoined Steaua as a youth coach.

On 25 March 2008, Bumbescu was decorated by the president of Romania Traian Băsescu with Ordinul "Meritul Sportiv" – ("The Sportive Merit" order) class II, for his part in the winning of the 1986 European Cup.

International career
Bumbescu won 15 caps for Romania during slightly less than three years, scoring once. He did not take part in any major international tournament, however.

International goals
Scores and results list Romania's goal tally first. "Score" column indicates the score after the player's goal.

Honours
Universitatea Craiova
Divizia A: 1979–80
Dinamo București
Divizia A: 1981–82
Cupa României: 1981–82
Steaua București
Divizia A: 1984–85, 1985–86, 1986–87, 1987–88, 1988–89
Cupa României: 1984–85, 1986–87, 1987–88, 1991–92
European Cup: 1985–86
UEFA Super Cup: 1986

References

External links

1960 births
Living people
Sportspeople from Craiova
Romanian footballers
Association football defenders
Liga I players
Liga II players
CS Universitatea Craiova players
FC Dinamo București players
FC Olt Scornicești players
FC Steaua București players
FC Callatis Mangalia players
Romania international footballers
Romanian football managers
CS Concordia Chiajna managers